G65 may refer to:

 Mercedes-AMG G65 AMG
 ORP Piorun (G65)
 G65 Baotou–Maoming Expressway
 Grumman G-65 Tadpole